Calonotos tripunctata is a moth of the subfamily Arctiinae. It was described by Herbert Druce in 1898. It is found in Saint Vincent, Trinidad and the Amazon region.

References

Arctiinae
Moths described in 1898
Moths of the Caribbean
Fauna of the Amazon
Moths of South America
Fauna of Saint Vincent and the Grenadines
Insects of Trinidad and Tobago